Puppets is a 1926 American silent drama film directed by George Archainbaud and starring Milton Sills, Gertrude Olmstead and Francis McDonald.

The film's sets were designed by the art director Milton Menasco. It was shot at the old Biograph Studios in New York and on location at the Italian puppet theatre in the city.

Cast
 Milton Sills as Nicki 
 Gertrude Olmstead as Angela 
 Francis McDonald as Bruno 
 Mathilde Comont as Rosa 
 Lucien Prival as Frank 
 William Ricciardi as Sandro 
 Nick Thompson as Joe

References

Bibliography
 Koszarski, Richard. Hollywood on the Hudson: Film and Television in New York from Griffith to Sarnoff. Rutgers University Press, 2008.

External links

1926 films
1926 drama films
Silent American drama films
Films directed by George Archainbaud
American silent feature films
1920s English-language films
First National Pictures films
American black-and-white films
1920s American films